The House of Representatives of the Philippines has three awards they confer to individuals; namely the Congressional Medal of Achievement (CMA), the Congressional Medal of Distinction (CMD), and the Congressional Medal of Excellence (CME).

Awards
The three congressional awards conferred by the House of Representatives are:

Congressional Medal of Achievement (CMA): for "political, economic, and cultural leaders, who have distinguished themselves through their life-work and their vision" (2002).
Congressional Medal of Distinction (CMD): for Filipino achievers in sports, business, medicine, science, and arts and culture.
Congressional Medal of Excellence (CME): For "exceptional modern-day national heroes in sports who win the gold medal in the Olympics". The award was instituted as a response to Hidilyn Diaz winning the Philippines' first ever Olympic gold medal at the 2020 Summer Olympics. (2021)

Recipients

Congressional Medal of Achievement

Congressional Medal of Distinction

Congressional Medal of Excellence

See also
Philippine Senate Medal of Excellence

References

Orders, decorations, and medals of the Philippines
Congressional Medal